Russell Charles Nagelson (born September 19, 1944) is an American former professional baseball player. He played in 62 games in Major League Baseball outfielder over three seasons as an outfielder and pinch hitter for the Cleveland Indians (1968–1970) and Detroit Tigers (1970). He collected 16 hits during his Major League career,

External links

1944 births
Living people
Major League Baseball outfielders
Cleveland Indians players
Detroit Tigers players
Baseball players from Cincinnati
Ohio State Buckeyes baseball players